One Day at a Time is an American television sitcom that aired on CBS from December 16, 1975, to May 28, 1984. It starred Bonnie Franklin as a divorced mother raising two teenage daughters, played by Mackenzie Phillips and Valerie Bertinelli, set in Indianapolis.

Background
The series was created by Whitney Blake and Allan Manings, a husband-and-wife writing duo who had both been actors in the 1950s and 1960s. The series was based on Whitney Blake's own life as a single mother raising her three children (including future actress Meredith Baxter) after her divorce from her first husband.

Overview
Divorced mother Ann Romano moves herself and her teenage daughters, rebellious Julie and wisecracking Barbara, from their home in Logansport, Indiana, to Indianapolis. Ann frequently struggles with maintaining her role as mother while affording her daughters the freedom she never had as a young woman.  Dwayne Schneider, the building superintendent, provides usually unwanted advice to the tenants, especially Ann.

Ann dates her divorce lawyer, David Kane, and they become engaged, but on their wedding day David says he wants kids; Ann does not, so they call off the wedding.

After David takes a job in Los Angeles, the show focuses on Ann's dilemmas as single mother and career woman, as well as the girls' growing pains, with Schneider becoming a more welcome part of the family. Ann's strained relationship with her ex-husband Ed slowly improves, as does the girls' relationship with his new wife Vickie. Julie and Barbara graduate from high school and head into the working world. Julie eventually marries flight attendant Max Horvath. Alex, the orphaned son of Ann's deceased boyfriend, moves in, changing the dynamics in the female-dominated apartment. Later in the series' run, Julie gives birth to daughter "Little Annie" Horvath, Barbara marries dental student Mark Royer, and Ann's mother Katherine moves nearby.

In the penultimate episode, Ann decides to take a job in London, leaving her daughters in Indianapolis raising their own families. In the series finale, Schneider also leaves town, moving to Florida to take care of his niece and nephew.

Production
For its entire run, the series was taped in Hollywood before a studio audience. Originally, it was taped at CBS Television City. Shortly after its premiere, the series began taping at Metromedia Square, where it remained until 1982. From 1982 to 1984, the series was taped at Universal Studios.

Like many sitcoms developed by Norman Lear, One Day at a Time often tackled serious issues in life and relationships, particularly those related to second-wave feminism, and can be considered an example of the "dramedy" (hybrid comedy/drama) genre. In an ironic twist, during the 1979–1980 season, Mackenzie Phillips was dealing with drug addiction and entered rehab in 1980, thus reflecting the Alcoholics Anonymous central sobriety saying, "One Day at a Time." Stories depicting such events as weddings, births, and other important milestones frequently stretched over two-, three-, and four-part episodes.

Theme song and opening credits
The theme song for One Day at a Time, "This Is It", was composed by Brill Building songwriter Jeff Barry and his wife Nancy Barry, and performed by recording artist Polly Cutter. The opening credits were originally seen over a filmed sequence showing Ann, Julie, and Barbara excitedly moving into their new home. Later, the opening credits sequence mostly consisted of clips of each cast member taken from previous episodes.

Casting
Actors Bonnie Franklin, Pat Harrington Jr., and Valerie Bertinelli were the only cast members to remain with the series throughout its entire run. Lead actress Mackenzie Phillips was fired after the fifth season due to growing problems with substance abuse. She later returned in a frequent recurring role. Original cast member Richard Masur was written out early in the second season, but returned as a guest star in the sixth-season finale.

Richard Masur played attorney David Kane, a love interest for the newly divorced Ann Romano, in the first season and left after the fourth episode of the second season. In a 2016 interview with The A.V. Club, he explained that David was constantly proposing marriage to Ann and she refused him every time. The actor became even further frustrated when Lear insisted that David and Ann's romance be unconsummated. His role was relegated to being a confidante to Julie and Barbara and an adversary to Schneider. After several disagreements with the direction Masur's character took, Lear agreed to write off David from the show but not entirely, per his appearance in the finale.

After Masur's departure, the producers replaced the romantic interest with a comedic foil. That role was filled by actress and comedienne Mary Louise Wilson, playing as Ginny Wroblicki, a cocktail waitress who becomes Ann's neighbor, best friend and confidante. It was an unhappy casting change all around, as the show’s ratings began to decline soon after Wilson's arrival, the character of Ginny Wroblicki proved to be unpopular with viewers, and Wilson herself did not like the role or get along with Franklin. Wilson wrote that "aside from Lear, nobody thought I was funny...To make matters worse, each character, according to the show's formula, had to have a 'serious' moral dilemma at some point, and I was given some problem about an illegitimate child to work out in these increasingly sentimental scenes that made my bowels shrink." At the end of the second season of One Day at a Time, Wilson was released from the show at her own request after appearing in 14 episodes.  The character of Ginny Wroblicki was never seen, referred to, or heard from again except in a fifth-season retrospective clip episode.

For the next two seasons, the central cast of Ann, Julie, Barbara and Schneider was supplemented by recurring characters, including William Kirby Cullen as Julie's boyfriend Chuck Butterfield, Howard Morton and K Callan as Chuck's parents, John Putch as Barbara's awkward friend Bob Morton, Scott Colomby as Barbara's boyfriend Cliff Randall, and John Hillerman and Charles Siebert as Ann's bosses, Mr. Connors and Mr. Davenport, respectively. Dick O'Neill and Nedra Volz made three appearances together as Orville and Emily, residents of the retirement home where the main characters put on a semiregular variety show. Joseph Campanella also made several appearances as Ann's ex-husband and the girls' father, Ed Cooper.

Michael Lembeck joined the series as Julie's husband, Max, in the fifth season, but he was written out as a consequence of Phillips' firing (but later returned in season seven along with Philips).  A steady stream of regulars was added in the ensuing seasons, including Ron Rifkin as Ann's boyfriend, Nick; Glenn Scarpelli as Nick's son, Alex; and Boyd Gaines as Barbara's boyfriend, later husband, Mark. Shelley Fabares, who had previously guest-starred as Ann's rival co-worker Francine Webster, appeared more frequently, eventually becoming a regular. Nanette Fabray, who played Ann's mother, also made more frequent appearances before becoming a regular cast member in the final season. Howard Hesseman joined the series for a short time as Mark's father, Sam, who would become Ann's second husband.

Notable guest stars throughout the series run include Norman Alden, Robby Benson, Carla Borelli, Charlie Brill, Dennis Burkley, Jack Dodson, Elinor Donahue, David Dukes, Greg Evigan, Conchata Ferrell, Corey Feldman, Alice Ghostley, Lee Grant, Mark Hamill, Jim Hutton, Terry Kiser, Richard Kline, Christopher Knight, Jay Leno, Robert Mandan, Robert Morse, Denise Nicholas, J. Pat O'Malley, Jo Ann Pflug, Eve Plumb, Susan Richardson, William Schallert, Gretchen Corbett, Suzanne Somers, Ellen Travolta, Dick Van Patten, and Keenan Wynn.

Main cast
  = Main cast (credited) 
  = Recurring cast (3+)
  = Guest cast (1-2)

Episodes

Reception

Ratings
One Day at a Time was best known in the 1980s as a staple of the CBS Sunday-night lineup, one of the most successful in TV history, along with Archie Bunker's Place, Alice, and The Jeffersons.

The series consistently ranked among the top twenty (if not the top ten) programs in the ratings. However, the network moved the show around on the prime time schedule eleven times. By the end of the 1982–83 season, viewership was beginning to slip and the series ended season eight ranking at No. 16. At this time, Bonnie Franklin and Valerie Bertinelli were anxious to move on, but agreed to do a ninth (and final) season.

Awards and honors
1981, 1982: Golden Globe Award for Best Supporting Actress – Series, Miniseries or Television Film to Valerie Bertinelli 
 1982: Primetime Emmy Award for Outstanding Directing in a Comedy Series to Alan Rafkin 
 1984: Primetime Emmy Award for Outstanding Supporting Actor – Comedy Series to Pat Harrington

Syndication
CBS aired daytime reruns of the show for three years. From September 17, 1979, to February 1, 1980, it aired on the daytime schedule at 3:30 pm Eastern time; with the cancellation of Love of Life to accommodate the expansion of The Young and the Restless to one hour, it was moved on February 4, 1980, to 4 pm Eastern due to Guiding Light moving to 3 pm. On September 28, 1981, it moved to 10 am Eastern time, and on September 20, 1982, it was replaced by The $25,000 Pyramid.

Soon after, the show entered off-network syndication, airing on local stations around the country, and nationally on WGN (currently known as NewsNation), TBS, and the E! Network.

Logo TV started airing episodes in April 2017.

As of July 23, 2017, the series airs Weekday evenings (formerly Sunday nights) on the digital broadcast network Antenna TV. It also can be seen on the satellite service FeTV. The series returned to Antenna TV on January 4, 2021.

As of 2020, it can also be seen weekday evenings on Hamilton, Ontario-based CHCH. It is also available to stream for free (with ads) on the CTV app.

Pluto TV airs the show on channel 506. All in the Family also airs on this channel.

As of 2022, Canada's CTV Television Network's streaming service’s "throwback" line-up features the entire run  of the series.

Cast reunions
The One Day at a Time Reunion was a 60-minute CBS retrospective special which aired on Tuesday February 22, 2005, at 9:00 pm ET, reuniting Bonnie Franklin, Mackenzie Phillips, Valerie Bertinelli, and Pat Harrington to reminisce about the series and their characters. Regular cast members Richard Masur, Shelley Fabares, Nanette Fabray, Michael Lembeck and Glenn Scarpelli shared their feelings about their time on the show in separate interviews. The special was included as a bonus on One Day at a Time: The Complete First Season DVD set.

On February 26, 2008, Franklin, Phillips, Bertinelli, and Harrington reunited once again to talk about life on the set, Phillips' drug problems, and the show's theme song on NBC's Today Show as part of a week-long segment titled "Together Again: TV's Greatest Casts Reunited".

Bertinelli, Harrington, and (on tape) Franklin appeared on the September 10, 2008, episode of Rachael Ray to celebrate Ray's 40th birthday.

In 2011, Franklin reunited again with Bertinelli on an episode of Hot in Cleveland which marked one of Franklin's last acting roles before her death in 2013. Mackenzie Phillips and Pat Harrington Jr. also made individual cameos on the series.

One Day at a Time was awarded the Innovation Award on the 2012 TV Land Award show on April 29. Accepting the award were Valerie Bertinelli, Bonnie Franklin, Pat Harrington Jr., Richard Masur, Mackenzie Phillips, and Glenn Scarpelli.

In July 2020, Bertinelli, Phillips, Lembeck and Scarpelli reunited on the Stars in the House video podcast, along with producers Norman Lear and Patricia Fass Palmer.

Home media
On April 24, 2007, Sony Pictures Home Entertainment released the first season of One Day at a Time on DVD in Region 1.

On September 7, 2017, it was announced that Shout! Factory had acquired the rights to the series and released One Day at a Time - The Complete Series on DVD in Region 1 on December 5, 2017. Season 2 was released on March 27, 2018. Season 3 was released on June 12, 2018.

Remake

Gloria Calderon Kellett and Mike Royce developed a new version of the series, with a Latino cast, for Netflix, beginning in 2017. Norman Lear also returned for the remake as executive producer. The ensemble is led by Justina Machado, with Rita Moreno, Stephen Tobolowsky, Isabella Gomez, Marcel Ruiz, and Todd Grinnell in supporting roles. Pam Fryman directed the pilot episode. Several members of the original cast and production crew returned in various capacities throughout the series run. Patricia Fass Palmer  returned as a producer for the remake; Mackenzie Philips had a recurring role as drug and alcohol counsellor, Pam; Glenn Scarpelli appeared in the season three episode “The First Time”; and Michael Lembeck directed the season one episode “Sex Talk”.

Notes

References

External links

 
 
Museum of Broadcast Communications page on One Day at a Time

1975 American television series debuts
1984 American television series endings
1970s American sitcoms
1980s American sitcoms
CBS original programming
English-language television shows
Television series by Sony Pictures Television
Television shows set in Indiana
Television shows set in Indianapolis
Television series about families